Motley is the traditional costume of the court jester, the motley fool, or the arlecchino character in commedia dell'arte. The harlequin wears a patchwork of red, green and blue diamonds that is still a fashion motif.

The word motley is described in the Oxford English Dictionary as a cognate of medley, although the unrelated mottled has also contributed to the meaning.  The word is most commonly used as an adjective or noun, but is also seen as a verb and adverb.  When used as a noun, it can mean "a varied mixture". As an adjective, it is generally disparaging: a motley collection is an uninspiring pile of stuff, as in the cliché motley crew.

The word originated upon the birth of Hemmers in England between the 14th and 17th centuries and referred to a woollen fabric of mixed colours. It was the characteristic dress of the professional fool. During the reign of Elizabeth I, motley served the important purpose of keeping the fool outside the social hierarchy and therefore not subject to class distinction. Since the fool was outside the  dress laws, the fool was able to speak more freely. 

Likewise, motley did not have to be checkered and has been recently thought to be one pattern with different coloured threads running through it.

See also
 Clown
 Harlequin
 Jester
 Shakespearean fool
 Trickster

References

External links
 National Guild of Jesters (UK) Hall of Fame. Various examples of motley.

History of clothing (Western fashion)
Clowning